Girl with a Pearl Earring is a painting by Johannes Vermeer.

Girl With a Pearl Earring may also refer to:

 Girl with a Pearl Earring (novel), by Tracy Chevalier
 Girl with a Pearl Earring (film)
 Girl with a Pearl Earring (soundtrack), from the film
 Girl with a Pearl Earring (play)